Salvador Amendola (born 13 May 1906, date of death unknown) was a Brazilian water polo player. He competed in the men's tournament at the 1932 Summer Olympics.

References

External links

1906 births
Year of death missing
Brazilian male water polo players
Olympic water polo players of Brazil
Water polo players at the 1932 Summer Olympics
Water polo players from Rio de Janeiro (city)